In the British Isles and parts of the Commonwealth, the May Queen or Queen of May is a personification of the May Day holiday, and of springtime and also summer. The May Queen is a girl who rides or walks at the front of a parade for May Day celebrations. She wears a white gown to symbolise purity and usually a tiara or crown. Her duty is to begin the May Day celebrations. She is generally crowned by flowers and makes a speech before the dancing begins. Certain age-groups dance around a Maypole celebrating youth and springtime.

History
James George Frazer speculated that the figure of the May Queen was linked to ancient tree worship. 

In the High Middle Ages in England the May Queen was also known as the "Summer Queen". George C. Homans points out: "The time from Hocktide, after Easter Week, to Lammas (1 August) was summer (estas)."

In 1557, a London diarist called Henry Machyn wrote:

"The xxx day of May was a goly May-gam in Fanch-chyrchestrett with drumes and gunes and pykes, and ix wordes dyd ryd; and thay had speches evere man, and the morris dansse and the sauden, and an elevant with the castyll, and the sauden and yonge morens with targattes and darttes, and the lord and the lade of the Maye".

Modern English: On the 30 May was a jolly May-game in Fenchurch Street (London) with drums and guns and pikes, The Nine Worthies did ride; and they all had speeches, and the morris dance and sultan and an elephant with a castle and the sultan and young moors with shields and arrows, and the lord and lady of the May".

Maintaining the tradition

Many areas keep this tradition alive today. The oldest unbroken tradition is Hayfield, Derbyshire, based on a much older May Fair. Another notable event includes the one in the Brentham Garden Suburb, England, which hosts it annually. It has the second oldest unbroken tradition although the May Queen of All London Festival at Hayes Common in Bromley is a close contender having been in existence for 105 years as of 2017. A May Day festival is held on the village green at Aldborough, North Yorkshire on a site that dates back to Roman times and the settlement of Isurium Brigantum. A May queen is selected from a group of 13 upward girls by the young dancers. She returns the next year to crown the new May Queen and stays in the procession. The largest event in this tradition in modern Britain is the Beltane Fire Festival in Edinburgh, Scotland.

A May Day celebration held annually since 1870 in New Westminster, British Columbia, Canada, has the distinction of being the longest running May Day celebration of its kind in the British Commonwealth.

Related personifications

Male companions to the May Queen, sometimes associated with May Day customs in Great Britain, include personifications known as Father May, King of the May, May King, Garland King, Green Man, or Jack in the Green. As part of this folk custom, some villages would choose a man to act as consort for the May Queen. This man, the May King, would dress in greenery to symbolise springtime.

See also
 May crowning

References

External links
 A translation of Grimm's Saga No. 365 about Hertha, Mother Earth, and a web essay on how she became the May Queen
 Freya, May Queen with references, songs and customs

Holiday characters
May
European mythology
Spring festivals